Menasce may refer to:

People
 Daniel Menasce, American engineer
 Jacques de Menasce (1905-1960), Austrian musician
 Jean de Menasce (1902–1973), French priest

Other
 Menasce Synagogue, Alexandria, Egypt